Fly Synthesis S.r.l is an Italian aircraft manufacturer based in Mortegliano. The company specializes in the design and manufacture of carbon fibre ultralight aircraft.

Founded in the late 1980s in Gonars, the company produced its first aircraft, the Storch in 1990. The company was sold to new owners, headed by Sonia Felice, in 2000. In 2006 the company moved to its present location, a  facility at the old military base in Mortegliano.

Aircraft

References

External links

Aircraft manufacturers of Italy
Italian companies established in 2000
Mortegliano